Fordis Clifford Parker  was an American politician who served in both branches of the Massachusetts legislature, and in both branches of the city council, and as the 38th mayor of Springfield, Massachusetts.

Notes

External links

1868 births
Mayors of Springfield, Massachusetts
Republican Party Massachusetts state senators
Republican Party members of the Massachusetts House of Representatives
Springfield, Massachusetts City Council members
1945 deaths